Dark End of the Street is an EP album by American singer-songwriter Chan Marshall, also known as Cat Power. It was released on 9 December 2008 by Matador Records.

Dark End of the Street was released both digitally and on a limited edition double 10". It contains six songs originally by Brendan Behan, James Carr, Sandy Denny, Creedence Clearwater Revival, Otis Redding, and Aretha Franklin, which were recorded during Cat Power's Jukebox sessions. Among the six, four were previously unpublished tracks.

Track listing
"Dark End of the Street" (Chips Moman, Dan Penn) *
"Fortunate Son" (John Fogerty)
"Ye Auld Triangle" (Dominic Behan) *
"I've Been Loving You Too Long (To Stop Now)" (Otis Redding, Jerry Butler)
"Who Knows Where the Time Goes?" (Sandy Denny) *
"It Ain't Fair" (Ronnie Miller) *

* previously unreleased

Personnel
Chan Marshall – vocals
Judah Bauer, Teenie Hodges – guitar
Erik Paparazzi – bass
Gregg Foreman, Spooner Oldham – piano, organ
Dylan Willemsa – viola
Jim White – drums
Larry McDonald – percussion

References

2008 EPs
Cat Power albums
Matador Records EPs
Covers EPs
Indie rock EPs